Vaduz Castle (German: Schloss Vaduz) is the palace and official residence of the Prince of Liechtenstein. The castle gave its name to the town of Vaduz, the capital of Liechtenstein, which it overlooks from an adjacent hilltop.

History
The former owners, who were presumably also the builders, were the counts of Werdenberg-Sargans. The bergfried (the keep, built in the 12th century) and parts of the eastern side are the oldest. The chapel of St. Anna was presumably built in the Middle Ages as well. The main altar is late-gothic. In the Swabian War of 1499, the castle was burned by the Swiss Confederacy. The western side was expanded by Count Kaspar von Hohenems (1613–1640).

The Princely Family of Liechtenstein acquired Vaduz Castle in 1712 when it purchased the countship of Vaduz. At this time, Charles VI, Holy Roman Emperor, combined the countship with the Lordship of Schellenberg, purchased by the Liechtensteins in 1699, to form the present Principality of Liechtenstein.

Today
The castle underwent a major restoration between 1904 and 1920, then again in the early 1920s during the reign of Prince Johann II, and was expanded during the early 1930s by Prince Franz Joseph II. Since 1938, the castle has been the primary residence of Liechtenstein's Princely Family. The castle is not open to the public as the princely family still lives in the castle.

Gallery

See also
List of castles in Liechtenstein
Valtice

References

External links
 

Castle
Castle
Castles in Liechtenstein
Royal residences in Liechtenstein